Taieb Fassi Fihri (born 9 April 1958) is a Moroccan politician who is Counsellor to King Mohammed VI since 2012. He was Secretary of State then Minister of Foreign Affairs from 1993 to 2012.

Education and career 
Fassi-Fihri graduated from the Descartes High School in Rabat with a French Baccalaureate in mathematics in June 1976. In 1980, he received the title of Application Engineer in Statistics at the National Institute of Statistics and Applied Economics (INSEA) in Rabat. In 1981, he obtained a Master's degree in "Public Economics and Planning" from the University Paris 1 Panthéon-Sorbonne. Then, in 1984, he obtained a Ph.D. in Economic Analysis and Policy at the Institute of Political Studies in Paris (Sciences Po).

Taïeb Fassi-Fihri became in June 1986 head of the division at the Ministry of Foreign Affairs and Cooperation in charge of relations with the European Community. In this capacity, he took part in the negotiations on relations between Morocco and the EEC.

In November 1989, he became director of the cabinet of the Minister of Foreign Affairs and Cooperation.

On 11 November 1993, Fassi-Fihri was appointed Secretary of State for Foreign Affairs and Cooperation; he retained this role in successive governments in June 1994, February 1995 and August 1997. He was also appointed chargé de mission at the Royal Cabinet on 16 March 1998.

On 25 November 1999, Fassi-Fihri was appointed a minister delegate of Foreign Affairs and Cooperation.

On 4 July 2002, Fassi-Fihri was appointed as the coordinator, responsible and sole interlocutor of the US authorities for the negotiation of the Morocco–United States Free Trade Agreement.

On 7 November 2002, he was appointed Minister for Foreign Affairs and Cooperation.

On 15 October 2007, he was designated Minister of Foreign Affairs and Cooperation under the new government of Abbas El Fassi.

On 2 January 2012, he was appointed Counselor to the Sovereign at the Royal Cabinet.

Personal life 
Fassi Fihri's brother, Ali Fassi Fihri, was the president of the Moroccan FA and CEO of the National Company of Electricity and Water. Taieb Fassi Fihri is also the cousin of former Prime Minister Abbas el Fassi. His niece, Zhor Fassi Fihri, is married to the son of former minister Moulay Hafid Elalamy.

Taieb Fassi Fihri is married to painter Fathiya Tahiri. Their son, is founder and president of the Amadeus Institute think tank.

References

Living people
Government ministers of Morocco
People from Casablanca
Moroccan engineers
1958 births
Moroccan diplomats
Advisors of Mohammed VI of Morocco
Alumni of Lycée Descartes (Rabat)